Nel blu, dipinto di blu, also known as Nel blu, dipinto di blu – Volare, is a 1959 Italian comedy film written and directed by Piero Tellini and starring Domenico Modugno, Giovanna Ralli and Vittorio De Sica.

Cast 
 Domenico Modugno as Turi La Rosa
 Giovanna Ralli as Assuntina
 Vittorio De Sica as Spartaco
 Ida Galli as Donata
 Franco Migliacci as Peppe
 Carlo Taranto as Remo
 Riccardo Garrone as "Tre Stecche"
 Gino Buzzanca as the Sicilian industrialist
 Elisabetta Velinska as the daughter of the industrialist
 José Jaspe as Maresciallo
 Juan Calvo as Sor Ettore
 Loris Bazzocchi as Carlino (credited as Antonio Bazzocchi)
 Gianni Meccia as Carabinieri Brigadier
 Elvira Tonelli as Sora Teresa
 Anna Campori as Donata's mistress
 Ada Colangeli as the owner of the shop

See also 
 List of Italian films of 1959

References

External links 
 

Italian comedy films
1959 comedy films
1959 films
Films with screenplays by Cesare Zavattini
Films scored by Mario Nascimbene
Italian black-and-white films
1950s Italian films